Tuber macrosporum, commonly known as the smooth black truffle, is a species of edible truffle in the family Tuberaceae. Found in Europe, and common in central Italy, the truffle was described as new to science by Italian mycologist Carlo Vittadini in 1831. The truffles are roughly spherical to irregular in shape, and typically measure  in diameter (rarely are they greater than ). The surface color ranges from reddish brown to rust to blackish. Warts on the fruit body surface are low, so that the truffle appears fairly smooth. The truffle flesh is purplish brown to grey-brown with thin white veins. It has an intense garlic-like odor similar to the Italian white truffle (Tuber magnatum). Host plants of T. macrosporum include poplars, hazel, linden, and oaks.

See also
 List of Tuber species

References

External links
 

Edible fungi
Fungi described in 1831
Fungi of Europe
macrosporum
Truffles (fungi)